Greek and Coptic is the Unicode block for representing modern (monotonic) Greek. It was originally used for writing Coptic, using the similar Greek letters, in addition to the uniquely Coptic additions. Beginning with version 4.1 of the Unicode Standard, a separate Coptic block has been included in Unicode, allowing for mixed Greek/Coptic text that is stylistically contrastive, as is convention in scholarly works. Writing polytonic Greek requires the use of combining characters or the precomposed vowel + tone characters in the Greek Extended character block.

Its block name in Unicode 1.0 was simply Greek, although Coptic letters were already included.

Block

History
In Unicode 1.0.1, a number of changes were made to this block in order to make Unicode 1.0.1 a proper subset of ISO 10646.
The small stigma, digamma, koppa and sampi were withdrawn for further study. These characters were added back in for Unicode 3.0.0.
The non-spacing dasia pneumata, psili pneumata and tonos were merged with non-spacing reversed comma above, comma above and vertical line above in the Combining Diacritical Marks block. The last was replaced by the spacing tonos, while in Unicode 5.1.0 the former two were replaced by the small heta and the capital archaic sampi.
The non-spacing iota below and diaeresis tonos were renamed and moved to the Combining Diacritical Marks block. The latter was replaced by the spacing diaeresis tonos, while the former was replaced by the capital heta in Unicode 5.1.0.
The Greek question mark, the upper and lower numeral signs and the aforementioned spacing tonos and diaeresis tonos, as well as the spacing iota below were moved to new positions within the block. They were replaced by the kai, or Greek &, (in Unicode 3.0.0), the capital and small archaic koppa (3.2.0), the yot (1.1.0), an alternative capital theta and the lunate epsilon (both 3.1.0) respectively.

The following Unicode-related documents record the purpose and process of defining specific characters in the Greek and Coptic block:

See also 
 Phonetic symbols in Unicode

References 

Coptic language
Greek language
Unicode blocks